Lukaya is a town in the Kalungu District of the Central Region of Uganda.

Location
Lukaya is on the Masaka–Kampala highway, close to the shores of Lake Victoria and just south of the equator. The coordinates of Lukaya are 0°09'03.0"S, 31°52'28.0"E (Latitude:-0.150833; Longitude:31.874444).

Overview
The town was founded by traders from India who traded primarily in coffee, cotton, and maize. Africans built restaurants and lodges in the town to cater for workers. Long distance truck drivers destined to the Western Region of Uganda and neighboring countries often stopped there to eat and rest. As of December 2017, the town had become a busy urban centre. Prostitution in Lukaya Town Council poses a health risk and is factor in the high HIV/AIDS prevalence in the town and surrounding neighborhoods. In 2013, the prevalence rate of HIV in the town was documented at 27 percent, compared to the national average of 7.3 percent, at the time.

Population
The 2002 population census estimated the population of the town at 14,147. In 2010, the Uganda Bureau of Statistics (UBOS) estimated the population to be 15,300. In 2011, UBOS estimated the population at 15,500. In 2014, the national population census put the population at 24,250.

Points of interest
The following additional points of interest are within the town limits or near its borders:
 mouth of the Katonga River, which enters Lake Victoria near Lukaya
 Lweera Swamp, a wetland that contains the sources of the River Katonga and reaches for nearly  along the highway between Lukaya to the south-west and Kayabwe to the north-east
 offices of Lukaya Town Council
 Lukaya central market
 Lukaya Health Centre
 Bajja Community Primary School
 King David High School.

See also
 List of cities and towns in Uganda

References

External links
 570 girls aged 15–24 years in Uganda get infected with HIV weekly As of 30 June 2016.

Populated places on Lake Victoria
Populated places in Uganda
Cities in the Great Rift Valley
Kalungu District